Daniel O. "Dan" Hoye served as Los Angeles City Controller from 1937 to 1961. On January 19, 1937, after the resignation of John S. Myers, Hoye was appointed by the Los Angeles City Council to replace him. He served until 1961, when he was defeated by Charles Navarro.

References

Los Angeles City Controllers
Year of death missing
Year of birth missing